Frank Neubert (28 September 1915 – 13 December 2003) was a highly decorated Major in the Luftwaffe during World War II, and a recipient of the Knight's Cross of the Iron Cross. He is believed to have been the first victor in aerial combat in World War II after shooting down Captain Mieczyslaw Medwecki's PZL P.11 in the early hours of 1 September 1939. The Knight's Cross of the Iron Cross was awarded to recognise extreme battlefield bravery or successful military leadership.  During his career he was credited with participating in 350+ missions.

Awards and decorations 
 Flugzeugführerabzeichen
 Front Flying Clasp of the Luftwaffe in Gold
 Ehrenpokal der Luftwaffe (14 October 1942)
 Iron Cross (1939)
 2nd Class
 1st Class
 Wound Badge (1939)
 in Black or Silver
 German Cross in Gold 5 February 1942 as Oberleutnant in the I./Sturzkampfgeschwader 2
 Knight's Cross of the Iron Cross on 22 June 1941 as Oberleutnant and Staffelkapitän of the 2./Sturzkampfgeschwader 2 "Immelmann"

Notes

References

Citations

Bibliography

External links 
TracesOfWar.com
Luftwaffe 39-45

1915 births
2003 deaths
Luftwaffe pilots
German World War II pilots
German Air Force personnel
Recipients of the Gold German Cross
Recipients of the Knight's Cross of the Iron Cross
People from Karlsruhe (district)
People from the Grand Duchy of Baden
Military personnel from Baden-Württemberg